The Fuchsbau is a military bunker system, located south of the town of Fürstenwalde, Brandenburg, about  east of Berlin.

The bunker served as Zentraler Gefechtsstand 14 (ZGS-14) ("Central Component Headquarters 14") of the East German Air Force Kommando LSK/LV from 1965 until 1990, when the compound became the headquarters of Bundeswehr's 5. Luftwaffendivision. The facilities were shut down in December 1994, when the 5. Luftwaffendivision was disbanded. With  of floor space,  of corridors, and up to 350 personnel, it was one of the largest bunkers in the German Democratic Republic (GDR).

References

External links 

 
 

 

Military installations of Germany
Military units and formations established in 1942
1942 establishments in Germany
Bunkers in Germany
Fortifications in Germany
Buildings and structures in Oder-Spree